The 8th Arizona State Legislature, consisting of the Arizona State Senate and the Arizona House of Representatives, was constituted from January 1, 1927, to December 31, 1928, during the first and second years of George W. P. Hunt's sixth tenure as Governor of Arizona, in Phoenix. The number of senators remained constant at 19, while the number of representatives increased from 47 to 52. The Democrats held large majorities in both houses.

Sessions
The Legislature met for the regular session at the State Capitol in Phoenix on January 10, 1927; and adjourned on April 20.

There was six special sessions of this legislature during 1927 and 1928. The first special session took place from January 3-January 8, 1927, before the regular session convened. The second special lasted a single day, March 30, 1927, while the regular session was in recess. The third session was convened on July 25, 1927, and adjourned on August 11, 1927. The fourth special session convened almost immediately following the adjournment of the third special session, on August 11, and went into recess on August 12. It reconvened on October 24, and adjourned on November 5. The fifth special session was convened on November 19, 1928, and adjourned on December 31, at 7:04 PM.  The sixth and final session was convened shortly thereafter at 8:30 PM, and adjourned at 3:10 AM on January 1, 1929.

State Senate

Members
The asterisk (*) denotes members of the previous Legislature who continued in office as members of this Legislature.

Employees
 Secretary: Dorothy Burton
 Assistant Secretary: William J. Graham
 Sergeant-at-Arms: Van A. Reichards
 Chaplain: Reverend E. E. Williams
 Doorkeeper: E. J. Fiock

House of Representatives

Members
The asterisk (*) denotes members of the previous Legislature who continued in office as members of this Legislature. The House grew by five seats from the 7th Legislature: 2 in Maricopa County, and 1 each in Coconino, Navajo, and Pima counties.

Employees
 Chief Clerk: F.R. Duffy
 Assistant Chief Clerk: Ora Orme
 Sergeant-at-Arms: O.J. Whiteside
 Chaplain: Reverend Seaborn Crutchfield

References

Arizona legislative sessions
1927 in Arizona
1928 in Arizona
1927 U.S. legislative sessions
1928 U.S. legislative sessions